The 12567 / 12568 Saharsa–Patna Rajya Rani Express is a Superfast Express train of the Rajya Rani Express series belonging to Indian Railways – East Central Railway zone that runs between  and  in India.

It operates as train number 12567 from Saharsa Junction to Patna Junction and as train number 12568 in the reverse direction, serving the state of Bihar. It is considered as Rajdhani Express or Shatabdi Express with general and AC coaches because its the fastest tain in this whole route and for best punctuality and cleanliness in train.

Coaches

The 12567 / 68 Saharsa Junction–Patna Junction Rajya Rani Express has 3 AC Chair Car, 18 General coach 2 EOG. New LHB rakes allotted.

As is customary with most train services in India, coach composition may be amended at the discretion of Indian Railways depending on demand.

Service

As the average speed of the train is above , as per Indian Railways rules, its fare includes a Superfast surcharge.

Routeing

Traction

As route is fully electrified, a Gomoh-based WAP-7 (HOG)-equipped locomotive hauls the train for its entire journey .

Operation

12567 Saharsa Junction–Patna Junction Rajya Rani Express runs from Saharsa Junction on a daily basis reaching Patna Junction the same day.
12568 Patna Junction–Saharsa Junction Rajya Rani Express runs from Patna Junction on a daily basis reaching Saharsa Junction the same day.

Incidents

On 19 August 2013, the 12567 Saharsa Junction–Patna Junction Rajya Rani Express ran over 37 persons & injured 24 persons who were illegally crossing the tracks at Dhamara Ghat station. Furious over the 12567 Saharsa Junction–Patna Junction Rajya Rani Express's refusal to give way to the trespassers or stop for them, a furious mob set fire to the engine & severely damaged railway property  .

See also

 Rajya Rani Express
 Dhamara Ghat train accident

References 

 http://media2.intoday.in/businesstoday/images/RailBudget_2011-12.pdf
 https://www.youtube.com/watch?v=unPbpqMab4Q
 http://archive.indianexpress.com/news/bihar-train-accident-37-killed-as-rajyarani-express-runs-over-pilgrims/1157072/
 http://archives.deccanchronicle.com/130819/news-current-affairs/article/12-feared-killed-speeding-train-bihar
 
 http://www.holidayiq.com/railways/saharsa-patna-rajya-rani-sf-express-12567-train.html

External links

Transport in Saharsa
Transport in Patna
Rajya Rani Express trains
Rail transport in Bihar
Railway services introduced in 2012